The 2012–13 season was Persepolis's 12th season in the Pro League, and their 30th consecutive season in the top division of Iranian Football. They competed in the Hazfi Cup. Persepolis saw a change in managerial role in the beginning of the season when Mustafa Denizli announced via an open letter to the fans that he couldn't cooperate with Perspolis anymore due to his personal problems and was replaced with former Al Ahly boss Manuel José. Persepolis is captained by Mehdi Mahdavikia.

Key events
 29 May: The Club introduces 10 of 2012–13 Seasons players, it means that they release professional players Asmir Avdukić, Misagh Memarzadeh, Hossein Hooshyar, Alireza Mohammad, Mojtaba Shiri, Mohammad Nosrati, Maziar Zare, Hossein Badamaki, Sheys Rezaei, Saman Aghazamani, Javad Kazemian, Ebrahim Shakouri, Vahid Hashemian, Mamadou Tall & Mehrdad Oladi. After few days Kazemian & Aghazamani had been returned to first team.
 30 May: Mohammad Ghazi joins The Club. This left footed striker signed two-years contract until the end of 2013–14 season.
 2 June:Mohammad Reza Khanzadeh & Afshin Esmaeilzadeh joins The Club as u-21 players. Both of them had been played for National youth teams.
 4 June: Mehrdad Pouladi signed a two-years contract after Team Melli's camp.
 5 June: After releasing all of their goalkeepers, the club signed Shahab Gordan for a season as a free deal .
 7 June: Hossein Mahini, Jalal Hosseini & Mohsen Bengar joins The Club. Mahini signed two-year contract while Hosseini & Bengar signing one-year contracts.
 22 June: Mustafa Denizli leave the reds. the Turkish coach terminate his contract because of personal problems.
 26 June: Karim Ansarifard, the top scorer of previous season joins The Club with three-years contract. Successor of The Legend, Ali Daei, will wear #9 jersey.
 30 June: Brazilian midfielder Roberto Sousa joins The Club after success in medical tests. Maritimo & Celta de Vigo previous Defensive midfielder signed two-years contract.
 3 July: Former Al Ahly coach Manuel José replaced Mustafa Denizli.
 4 July: Ali Karimi & Mehdi Mahdavikia extends their contract for another year. Mahdavikia announces that it will his last season of playing football.
 12 July: Eamon Zayed extend his contract for another year.
 19 July: Persepolis started the league with a 1–0 win at Sanat Naft with a goal from Javad Kazemian.
 13 September: 45 days after injury, Roberto Sousa & The Club reached agreement to terminate the contract.
 31 October: Persepolis defeated Paykan 6–0 with a hat-trick from Karim Ansarifard, revive the famous 6–0 win against the rival Eteghlal in 1973 derby.
 3 December: Persepolis finished the first half of the league in 12th place, same with last season's final rank.
 7 December: Manuel José was sacked as the manager of the club and was replaced by his assistant Yahya Golmohammadi, a former player and captain of the team.
 19 December: Golmohammadi celebrated his first game as the manager of the Persepolis with a 6–0 win against Malavan in the first match of the season's Hazfi Cup campaign.
 30 December: Gholamreza Rezaei scored the fastest goal in the history of Iran Pro League and also the fastest in 2012 in a 2–0 win over Fajr Sepasi.
 14 March: Mehdi Mahdavikia announced his retirement before the match against Mes Kerman. Former Team Melli's captain also announce that if Persepolis reach the Hazfi Cups final, this match will be his farewell match.

Squad

First team squad

Apps and goals updated as of 10 May 2013 
For more on the reserve and academy squads, see Persepolis Novin, Persepolis Academy & Persepolis Qaem Shahr.
Source: fc-perspolis.com, FFIRI.IR

Iran Pro League squad

Updated 17 July 2012.

On loan

Transfers

Summer 

In:

Out:

Winter 

In:

Out:

Competitions

Overview

Iran Pro League

Standings

Results summary

Results by round

Matches

Hazfi Cup

Matches

Friendly Matches

Pre-season

During season

Statistics

Appearances, goals and disciplinary record

Injuries during The season 
Players in bold are still out from their injuries.

Overall statistics

Updated as of 10 May 2013 
Source: Competitions

Club

Kit 

|
|
|

Official sponsors
 Uhlsport
•  Sadra System Pasargad
•  Iran Aseman Airlines
•  Opel Iran
•  Damavand Mineral Water Co.
Source: Persian

Starting formations

Captains
Updated on 10 May 2013

♦ Players who no longer play for Persepolis's current season.

Coaching staff

Jose's Coaching staff

Other personnel

Club committees

{| class="wikitable" "align: right;"
|-
! Munition Team
|-
| Ghasem Abdolsamadi
|-
| Asghar Norouzali

Grounds

See also
 2012–13 Persian Gulf Cup
 2012–13 Hazfi Cup

References

External links
 Iran Premier League Statistics
 Persian League

Persepolis F.C. seasons
Persepolis